Bakwa-Tshileu or  Bakwa-Tshileo is a village in the Democratic Republic of the Congo. It is one of the ten villages that make up collectivity of Bakwa-Mulumba that is located in the territory of Gandajika and in the province of Lomami.

History

Transport

Education 
Educational structure in Bakwa-Tshileu is primary school and secondary school. Primary school classified as from first grade to 6th grade and secondary school is classified as from 7th grade to 12th grade.

Populated places in Lomami